Richard Brooke may refer to:

Richard Brooke (Norton) (died 1569), bought the manor of Norton, near Runcorn, Cheshire
Richard Brooke (physician) (1716–1783), American physician
Richard Brooke (antiquary) (1791–1861), English antiquary
Richard Brooke (priest) (1840–1926), Archdeacon of Cape Town from 1905 until 1926
Richard Brooke (cricketer) (1909–1973), English cricketer and clergyman
Richard Kendall Brooke (1930–1996), South African ornithologist
Richard Brooke (explorer) (1927–2020), British explorer and Royal Naval surveyor
Richard Broke (judge) (died 1529), also written Richard Brooke, baron of the Exchequer
Sir Richard Brooke (multiple) - see Brooke baronets

See also
Richard Broke (disambiguation)
Richard Brook (disambiguation)
Richard Brooks (disambiguation)